The Far Eastern University – Institute of Nursing, or simply IN, is an academic institute for nurse education of the Far Eastern University. It is regarded as one of the top-performing nursing schools in the Philippines in terms of Philippine Nurse Licensure Examination performance and employment in various nursing settings.  IN offers programs leading to a Bachelor of Science degree in Nursing and a Master of Arts degree in Nursing. 

At present, the Institute is accredited LEVEL III by the Philippine Accrediting Association of Schools, Colleges, and Universities (PAASCU).

The Institute of Nursing's Virtual Integrated Nursing Education Simulation (VINES) Laboratory was the first nursing virtual laboratory in the Philippines and the second in Asia.

Brief history 
In 1955, three years after the establishment of the Institute of Medicine, it started as the School of Nursing. In its initial run, it only offered a non-degree Graduate of Nursing diploma. Started with a low population of enrollees, the School of Nursing has faced many challenges but worked its way up by continually enhancing its curriculum, re-caliberating its faculty, and establishing linkages with distinguished institutions. It eventually elevated as the Institute of Nursing in 1959.

In 1961, IN began offering the baccalaureate program leading to Bachelor of Science in Nursing.

Deans of the Institute of Nursing

Mrs. Teofista G. Villarica (1955–1960) Principal of three-year diploma program leading to a non-degree Graduate in Nursing (GN)
Mrs. Lucrecia Llanera (1955–1960) Directress of two-year Advance professional Program
Dean Felicidad D. Elegado (1960–1978) School of Nursing elevated to Institute status, first dean of the Institute of Nursing
Dean Lydia A. Palaypay (1978–1995)
Dean Norma M. Dumadag (1995–2006)
Dean Annabelle R. Borromeo (2006–2009)
Dean Glenda S. Arquiza (2009–2011)
Dean Rosalinda P. Salustiano (2011–2013)
Dean Ma. Belinda G. Buenafe (2013–2022)

Affiliated hospitals
Below is a list of some hospitals in the Philippines currently accredited and affiliated with the Far Eastern University - Institute of Nursing wherein students from the Institute are being trained and supervised by qualified Clinical Instructors from the university and nursing theories are applied as part of delivery of nursing care.

Metro Manila area

Provincial hospitals

Facilities

Virtual Integrated Nursing Education Simulation Laboratory (VINES) 
The Virtual Integrated Nursing Education Simulation Laboratory or VINES is a hospital laboratory set-up closely approximates to the standards of the Joint Commission, the leading health care accrediting body in the USA, and other international hospital and infection standards in terms of bed-to-sink ratios, hospital door widths, functionality, work and patient flow.

Located in the Nursing Building at the FEU campus, the laboratory is accessible to all students of IN.

References

External links
 
 https://web.archive.org/web/20110722114758/http://www.nursinglibrary.org/Portal/main.aspx?pageid=4024&pid=20234
 http://stti.confex.com/stti/congrs08/techprogram/paper_40233.htm

Far Eastern University
Nursing schools in the Philippines
Educational institutions established in 1955
1955 establishments in the Philippines